The 2006 Interprovincial Hurling Championship, known as the 2006 M Donnelly Hurling Interprovincial Championship due to the tournament's sponsorship by businessman Martin Donnelly, was the 79th series of the Interprovincial Championship. The annual hurling championship between the four historic provinces of Ireland was contested by Connacht, Leinster, Munster and Ulster. The championship was won by Leinster.

Results

Inter provincial Championship

Top scorers

Championship

Single game

Railway Cup Hurling Championship
Interprovincial Hurling Championship
Hurling